Hervey William Gurney Benham (1910–1987) was an English journalist, the founding proprietor of Essex County Newspapers, an author of books on Essex and the East Coast, a musician, and benefactor. Of his at least fourteen books, among the best known are  Down Tops'l, Last Stronghold of Sail and Once Upon a Tide.

Biography
Hervey Benham was the son of William Gurney Benham (three-times Mayor of Colchester and editor of the Essex County Standard from 1884 to 1943) and Ethel Hervey Elwes. He succeeded his father as editor of the Essex County Standard from 1943 to 1965. In 1964 he commenced production of the paper using web-offset lithography a revolutionary printing process that he had pioneered with fellow newspaper proprietor Arnold Quick in Colchester, Essex. The Standard was described by the trade paper Printing World as Britain's best produced weekly newspaper.

His daughter, Jane Benham, played a significant role in the maritime educational East Coast Sail Trust, in which Hervey was also involved, and in the preservation of Thames sailing barges.

Publications
Books written by Hervey Benham include:

References

Sources
 

English newspaper editors
English male journalists
English male non-fiction writers
1910 births
1987 deaths